Dueces Wild is the second solo studio album by American rapper Vast Aire, one half of the duo Cannibal Ox. It was released on One Records and Gracie Productions in 2008.

Critical reception

Matt Rinaldi of AllMusic gave the album a favorable review, describing it as "another elevated LP for listeners who prefer their rap hard-boiled and brainy as hell." Jake Paine of HipHopDX gave the album a 3.0 out of 5, writing: "Regardless of seasoned or newcomer production personnel, Deuces Wild bares a consistency that feels as if one musical mind made it." Ben Westhoff of Pitchfork gave the album an 8.0 out of 10, commenting that "what's most impressive about the work is that it succeeds without succumbing to the trends of hipster rap, emo rap, or radio rap."

XXL placed it at number 6 on the "Top 10 Rap Albums of 2008" list.

Track listing

Personnel
Credits adapted from liner notes.

 Vast Aire – vocals
 Le Parasite – production (1)
 Melodious Monk – production (2, 3, 7, 12, 13)
 Geechi Suede – vocals (4)
 Aspect One – production (4)
 Copywrite – vocals (5)
 Walter Rocktight – production (5)
 Vordul Mega – vocals (6)
 Pete Rock – production (6)
 Oh No – production (8)
 Double A.B. – vocals (9)
 Thanos – vocals (9)
 Swave Sevah – vocals (9)
 Karniege – vocals (9)
 DJ Priority – production (9)
 Falside – production (10)
 Thanos – production (11)
 Genesis – vocals (12)
 Joel Myer – mixing
 See Russell – art direction, design
 Raoul Sinier – original art illustration

References

External links
 

2008 albums
Vast Aire albums
Albums produced by Oh No (musician)
Albums produced by Pete Rock